WAAG (FM 94.9 MHz), known as FM 95, is a radio station licensed for Galesburg, Illinois, United States.  The station is owned by Galesburg Broadcasting Company.

The station has a country music format, plus presents news and market information throughout the day. One feature of the station's format is a classic country program, presented at noon weekdays and for three hours on Sunday mornings; during these blocks, music from the 1940s through early 1990s are played.

References

External links

Galesburg, Illinois
AAG
Country radio stations in the United States
Radio stations established in 1966
1966 establishments in Illinois